Alexander Forbes may refer to:

Scottish noblemen
 Alexander Forbes, 1st Lord Forbes (died 1448), Scottish baron
 Alexander Forbes, 4th Lord Forbes (died 1491), Scottish baron
 Alexander Forbes, 10th Lord Forbes (died 1672), Scottish baron, the 10th Lord Forbes
 Alexander Forbes, 4th Lord Forbes of Pitsligo (1678–1762), Scottish philosopher and Jacobite

Other people
 Alexander Forbes (bishop of Aberdeen) (1564–1617), bishop of Aberdeen
 Alexander Forbes (bishop of Brechin) (1817–1875), Scottish Episcopal Bishop of Brechin
 Alexander Kinloch Forbes (1821–1865), British administrator in India, writer
 Alexander Forbes (explorer) (1778–1862), Scottish explorer
 Alexander F. I. Forbes (1871–1959), South African astronomer
 Alexander Forbes (neurophysiologist) (1882–1965), American neurophysiologist and medical school professor
 Alex Forbes (1925–2014), Scottish football player (Arsenal, Scotland)
 Alex S. Forbes (fl. 1928–1935), Scottish football player
 Jim Forbes (Australian politician) (Alexander James Forbes, 1923–2019), Australian soldier and politician

Businesses 
 Alexander Forbes Group Holdings, a financial services group with its head office in South Africa